Wu Xian'en (August 30, 1907 – November 1, 1987) was a People's Liberation Army lieutenant general. He was born in Huang'an County, Hubei Province (his birthplace is now part of Xin County, Henan Province). He died in Beijing.

1907 births
1987 deaths
People's Liberation Army generals from Henan
People from Xinyang
People of the Republic of China